The 1970 Murrumbidgee state by-election was held on 14 February 1970 for the New South Wales Legislative Assembly seat of Murrumbidgee. It was triggered by the resignation of Al Grassby to successfully contest the federal seat of Riverina at the 1969 election.

Dates

Result 

Al Grassby resigned to successfully contest the 1969 election for Riverina.

See also
Electoral results for the district of Murrumbidgee
List of New South Wales state by-elections

References 

1970 elections in Australia
New South Wales state by-elections
1970s in New South Wales
February 1970 events in Australia